Events from the year 2009 in Ghana.

Incumbents
 President: John Kufuor (until 7 January), John Atta Mills
 Vice President: Aliu Mahama (until 7 January), John Dramani Mahama
 Chief Justice: Georgina Theodora Wood

Events
 January 7 - John Atta Mills took office as president, the second time power in the country had been transferred from one legitimately elected leader to another democratically.
But John Atta Mills died a few days from his birthday after feeling sick and rushed to the hospital.

References